Monroe Trout, Jr. (born January 22, 1962) is a retired financial speculator and hedge fund manager profiled in the book New Market Wizards by Jack D. Schwager. Monroe Trout, Jr.'s expertise is in quantitative analysis, with pattern recognition backed by statistical analysis. He subscribes to Ayn Rand's Objectivism. He has traded stocks, stock index futures, commodity futures, and options on all these, both for his own account and as an advisor for others.

Early years 
Monroe Trout, Jr. is the son of Monroe E. Trout, the former Chairman Emeritus of American Healthcare Systems. In 1978 in his hometown of New Canaan, Connecticut at the age of 17, Trout got a summer job with a futures trader. Trout typed in newspaper data into his computer and got his start in markets trading.

He was captain of the Harvard basketball team and led his team to a third-place finish in 1984's Ivy League.

He graduated magna cum laude from Harvard College in 1984 with a B.A. in Economics. His senior honors thesis was on stock index futures titled “Price movements in a Stock Index Futures Market”.

Career 
Monroe Trout began his career when he went to New York City to work for Victor Niederhoffer's NCZ Commodities at New York's commodity pits. In his 20s during one stretch he turned a profit 69 out of 79 months and became something of a celebrity on the trading floor. He also worked as a floor trader on two more exchanges before starting his own firm, Trout Trading, in 1986. Later, he would move his family and the company to Bermuda.

In 1993, he helped fund Rand Financial Services named after Ayn Rand. He keeps a low profile. At age 40, he retired from active trading with a net worth reportedly in excess of US$900 million.

He is featured in the book The New Market Wizards by Jack Schwager.

See also 

 Paper trading
 Toby Crabel
 James Altucher
 Jake Burton Carpenter

Notes

References

Further reading 
 
 Elstrom, Peter J. W.|Crain's Chicago Business|May 24, 1993|Futures whiz Trout stays hot, despite trading snag

External links 
 Turtle Trader
 Street Stories
 Boy Plunger

1962 births
Living people
American financial analysts
American hedge fund managers
American investors
American money managers
American stock traders
Stock and commodity market managers
Objectivists
Harvard Crimson men's basketball players
Harvard University alumni
American men's basketball players
People from New Canaan, Connecticut
Basketball players from Connecticut
Businesspeople from Connecticut
Expatriates in Bermuda
Sportspeople from Fairfield County, Connecticut